Romagnol (rumagnòl) is a group of closely related dialects part of Emilian-Romagnol continuum which are spoken in the historical region of Romagna, which is now mainly in the southeastern part of Emilia-Romagna, Italy. The name is derived from the Lombard name for the region, Romagna. Romagnol is also spoken outside the region, particularly in the independent country of San Marino. Romagnol is classified as endangered because older generations have "neglected to pass on the dialect as a native tongue to the next generation".

Classification
Romagnol is one of the two branches of the Emilian-Romagnol continuum. The Romagnol dialects form a dialect continuum with their neighbouring Romagnol varieties, while the more distant dialects might be less mutually intelligible. Variants spoken north of the Santerno river are considered by speakers of Sammarinese as being hardly intelligible.
The Gallo-Italic family includes Piedmontese, Ligurian and Lombard, all of which maintain a level of mutual intelligibility with both Romagnol and Emilian.

Geographic distribution

Western border 
West of Romagna, the Emilian language is spoken. The border with Emilian-speaking areas is the Sillaro river, which runs 25 km east from Bologna to the west of Castel San Pietro Terme. Romagnol is spoken to the east of this river and to the south of the Reno river.  In Emilia-Romagna, Emilian is spoken in all the rest of the region moving from the Sillaro river to the west, up to Piacenza, and to the north of the Reno, up to the Po.

Northern border 
The Reno River is the border between Romagnol and the dialect of Ferrara. Romagnol is spoken also in some villages northwards of the Reno River, such as Argenta and Filo, where people of Romagnol origin live alongside people of Ferrarese origin. Ferrara goes into Emilian language territory.

Southern border 
Outside Emilia-Romagna, Romagnol is spoken in the Republic of San Marino ("Sammarinese"), and in two municipalities located in the province of Florence, Marradi and Palazzuolo sul Senio.

In the Province of Pesaro and Urbino of Marche region, Gallic-Picene is spoken, but its status as sub-variant of Romagnol or as separate language is disputed.

History
Romagnol's first acknowledgement outside regional literature was in Dante Alighieri's treatise De vulgari eloquentia, wherein Dante compares “the language of Romagna” to his native Tuscan dialect. Eventually, in 1629, the author Adriano Banchieri wrote the treatise Discorso della lingua Bolognese, which countered Dante's claim that the Tuscan dialect was better, arguing his belief that Bolognese (an Emilian dialect influenced by Romagnol that saw wide use in writing) was superior in “naturalness, softness, musicality, and usefulness.” Romagnol received more recognition after Romagna gained independence from the Papal States.

Literature

16th to 19th century 
The first appearance of a distinct Romagnol literary work is "Sonetto romagnolo" by Bernardino Catti, from Ravenna, printed 1502. It is written in a mixture of Italian and Romagnol.

The first Romagnol poem dates back to the end of the 16th century: E Pvlon matt. The original poem comprised twelve cantos, of which only the first four survived (1848 lines).

The first Romagnol poet to win fame was the cleric Pietro Santoni, (Fusignano, 1736–1823). He was the teacher of Vincenzo Monti, one of the most famous Italian poets of his time.

20th century 
The 20th century saw a flourishing of Romagnol literature. Theatrical plays, poems and books of a high quality were produced. Some of the best known Romagnol authors are:
 Raffaello Baldini, who won in 1988 the "Premio Viareggio" and in 1995 the "Premio Bagutta," known for long pessimistic poems and prose
 Tonino Guerra (1920–2012), wrote poems during his exile to WWII-era Germany, focusing on people of suffering and poverty
 Olindo Guerrini, with "Sonetti romagnoli" 
 , an antifascist exiled from Romagna. He wrote poems such as "Rumâgna" that were often descriptive of Romagna

Grammar

Morphology
Unlike Standard Italian, not all nouns end in a theme vowel. Masculine nouns lack theme vowels, and feminine nouns typically (but not always) terminate in a. Masculine nouns and adjectives undergo lexically-specified ablaut to form the plural, and feminine nouns and adjectives form the plural by a becoming i or being deleted after a consonant cluster or a double consonant.

Both languages derive their lexicon from Vulgar Latin, but some words differ in gender.

Syntax
Italian and Romagnol share much of the same features when it comes to verbs. Both languages use subject-verb-object in simple sentences for their word order. Verbs are conjugated according to tense, mood, and person. Romagnol also has four conjugations, compared to Standard Italian's three: the first, -êr; the second, -ér; the third, -ar; and the fourth, -ìr.  Marked differences in Romagnol from Standard Italian are that personal pronouns are required, and some verbs in Romagnol use a reflexive construction even if the speaker is not the second argument of the verb although Italian uses an intransitive construction. 

Impersonal verbs, which lack a canonical subject, in Romagnol use "avèr" but in Standard Italian use "essere." Even though the subject is null, an expletive pronoun is inserted in the specifier position, much like "it" in English.
 Italian: è piovuto, It rained
 Romagnol: l'à piuvù, It rained

Also, whereas Standard Italian and other northern dialects omit the definite article before "singular names and names of relatives", Romagnol keeps it.

Phonology
Romagnol has lexical and syntactic uniformity throughout its area. However, its pronunciation changes as one goes from the Po Valley to the hills.

It has an inventory of up to 20 vowels that contrast in the stressed position, compared to 7 in Italian. They are marked in the orthography by using diacritics on a, e, i, o and u.

The absence of an official institution regulating its orthography often leads to ambiguities in the transcription of vowel sounds.

Syllable structure
Some words that in Latin are trisyllabic or tetrasyllabic in which u is not stressed are reduced in Romagnol to being only monosyllabic. An atonic syllable is dropped.

Vowels
These three tables list the vowel inventory of the "classical" version of the northern macro-dialect of Romagnol.

The following table lists the vowels above alongside their relative orthography:

Consonants

The letter z is always pronounced as either [] or [] and not [] or [] as in Standard Italian.

[] occurs only before velar stops.

Romagnol, in addition to its larger inventory of vowels, also has more consonants compared to Standard Italian. Additionally, consonants have these differences from Standard Italian:

 In central dialects, word-final n is deleted, and the preceding vowel is nasalised, as is shown above.
 and  can occur word-finally and are usually distinguished by the doubling of the final consonants (cc or gg).
 The voicing of those consonants is always contrastive.

References

Emilian-Romagnol language
Languages of Italy
Languages of Emilia-Romagna
Languages of le Marche
Languages of San Marino